Zigadaf (also Romanized as Zīgadaf; also known as Zīdekīdaf and Zītgadaf) is a village in Surak Rural District, Lirdaf District, Jask County, Hormozgan Province, Iran. At the 2006 census, its population was 608, in 136 families.

References 

Populated places in Jask County